Viktors Lukaševičs (born 17 March 1972) is a former Latvian footballer.

External links

1972 births
Living people
Latvian footballers
Latvia international footballers
Association football defenders